The Co-op Block and J. N. Ireland Bank is a commercial block in Malad City, Idaho. It was added to the National Register of Historic Places on April 18, 1979.

A section facing onto Main and a section facing onto Bannock were built in 1893, as part of an L-shaped structure built around a pre-existing wood-frame building at the corner. The corner building was replaced in 1907 by the J. N. Ireland and Co. Bank building.  The entire block was built of red brick which was later whitewashed.

See also
 List of National Historic Landmarks in Idaho
 National Register of Historic Places listings in Oneida County, Idaho

References

Bank buildings on the National Register of Historic Places in Idaho
Buildings and structures in Oneida County, Idaho
National Register of Historic Places in Oneida County, Idaho